Tazewell County is a county located in the southwestern portion of the U.S. state of Virginia. As of the 2020 census, the population was 40,429. Its county seat is Tazewell.

Tazewell County is part of the Bluefield, WV-VA Micropolitan Statistical Area. Its economy was dependent on coal and iron of the Pocahontas Fields from the late 19th into the 20th century.

History 

Tazewell County was long a hunting ground for various historic Native American tribes and their ancestral indigenous cultures. Although rare in the eastern United States, there are petroglyphs near the summit of Paintlick Mountain. Among the tribes that occupied this area in historic times were the Lenape (Delaware), and the Iroquoian-speaking Cherokee and members of the Iroquois Confederacy.

In the spring of 1771, Thomas and John Witten established the first permanent settlement in Tazewell County at Crab Orchard.

As population increased in the area, Tazewell County was created on December 20, 1799. The land for the county was taken from portions of Wythe and Russell counties. It was named after Henry Tazewell, a United States senator from Virginia, state legislator and judge. Delegate Littleton Waller Tazewell originally opposed the formation of the new county but when Simon Cotterel, who drew up the bill to form the county, changed the originally proposed name of the county to Tazewell's namesake, in honor of his father Henry who had died earlier that year, the bill passed.

Jeffersonville was established the following year (1800) as the county seat. On February 29, 1892, Jeffersonville was renamed as Tazewell.

During the early settlement period, many Scots-Irish settled through the Appalachian backcountry, including Tazewell.

After the Civil War, construction of railroads in southwestern Virginia enabled the development of coal and iron resources in the Clinch Valley. Richlands had a boom economy in the early 1890s, and became a rougher place with young industrial workers and more saloons. 

The profits generated by the coal boom resulted in the development of mansions and the elaborate Richlands Hotel, said to rival the best hotels of New York City. But it was forced to close after the boom cycle ended. It was used for other purposes.

Tazewell County was the focus of a 2005 article in Time Magazine about the opioid epidemic: however, the sheriff H. S. Caudill claimed the article misrepresented Tazewell County and his statements to the reporter.

Representation in other media
Paramount's 1994 film Lassie was filmed here. It was based on stories of Albert Payson Terhune.

Geography

Since it contains portions of the Ridge-and-Valley Appalachians and the Cumberland Plateau, Tazewell County has very distinct geologic areas within the county.  One of the most unusual areas is Burke's Garden, a bowl-shaped valley formed by the erosion of a doubly plunging anticline.  Tazewell County includes the headwaters of four watersheds, which are the Upper Clinch, Middle New, North Fork Holston, and Tug. It also has the headwaters of the Bluestone River, which flows into West Virginia, where a portion is protected as a Wild and Scenic River.

Adjacent counties
 McDowell County, West Virginia, (North and West)
 Mercer County, West Virginia, (Northeast)
 Buchanan County, (Northwest)
 Russell County, (West)
 Smyth County, (South)
 Bland County, (East)

National protected area
 Jefferson National Forest (part)

Major highways

Demographics

2020 census

Note: the US Census treats Hispanic/Latino as an ethnic category. This table excludes Latinos from the racial categories and assigns them to a separate category. Hispanics/Latinos can be of any race.

2000 Census
As of the census of 2000, there were 44,598 people, 18,277 households and 13,232 families residing in the county.  The population density was 86 people per square mile (33/km2).  There were 20,390 housing units at an average density of 39 per square mile (15/km2).  The racial makeup of the county was 96.16% White, 2.29% Black or African American, 0.17% Native American, 0.61% Asian, 0.16% from other races, and 0.62% from two or more races.  0.51% of the population Hispanic or Latino of any race.

There were 18,277 households, out of which 28.70% had children under the age of 18 living with them, 58.20% were married couples living together, 10.80% had a female householder with no husband present, and 27.60% were non-families. 25.20% of all households were made up of individuals, and 11.90% had someone living alone who was 65 years of age or older.  The average household size was 2.40 and the average family size was 2.85.

In the county, the population was spread out, with 21.40% under the age of 18, 8.40% from 18 to 24, 27.20% from 25 to 44, 27.50% from 45 to 64, and 15.50% who were 65 years of age or older.  The median age was 41 years. For every 100 females, there were 92.00 males.  For every 100 females age 18 and over, there were 88.70 males.

The median income for a household in the county was $27,304, and the median income for a family was $33,732. Males had a median income of $28,780 versus $19,648 for females. The per capita income for the county was $15,282.  About 11.70% of families and 15.30% of the population were below the poverty line, including 20.30% of those under age 18 and 13.90% of those age 65 or over.

Education

Colleges 
 Bluefield University, Bluefield
 Southwest Virginia Community College, borders Russell County, near Richlands

Public high schools 
All public schools in Tazewell County are operated by Tazewell County Public Schools system.
 Graham High School, Bluefield
 Richlands High School, Richlands
 Tazewell High School, Tazewell

Professional sports teams 
 Bluefield Blue Jays, minor league baseball team based in Bluefield

Communities

Towns
 Bluefield
 Cedar Bluff
 Pocahontas
 Richlands
 Tazewell

Census-designated places
 Claypool Hill
 Gratton
 Raven (partially in Russell County)
 Springville

Other unincorporated communities

 Abbs Valley
 Bandy
 Baptist Valley
 Bishop (partial)
 Boissevain
 Burkes Garden
 Falls Mills
 Frog Level
 Hidden Valley
 Jewell Ridge
 Liberty
 North Tazewell
 Paintlick
 Pisgah
 Pounding Mill
 Red Ash
 Tannersville
 Tiptop
 Thompson Valley
 Wardell

Law enforcement

The Tazewell County Sheriff's Office (TCSO) is the primary law enforcement agency in Tazewell County.  the agency is headed by Sheriff Brian Hieatt. Since the establishment of the Tazewell County Sheriff's Office, two prohibition officers, one justice of the peace, and one sheriff's deputy have died in the line of duty.

In 2016, the department was criticized by the Freedom from Religion Foundation for having stickers saying "In God We Trust" on its cars. In 2022, the department again received a letter from the FFRF, stating that Sheriff Hieatt led prayers at religious events in uniform, and criticizing it for posting religious messages on its Facebook page.

Politics

See also 
 National Register of Historic Places listings in Tazewell County, Virginia
 Pocahontas coalfield
 Cavitt's Creek at Lake Witten

References

Further reading
 Englund, K.J. and R.E. Thomas. (1991). Coal resources of Tazewell County, Virginia [U.S. Geological Survey Bulletin 1913]. Washington, D.C.: U.S. Department of the Interior, U.S. Geological Survey.

External links
 Community Foundation of the Virginias, Inc.
 Official Tazewell County website
 Tazewell County Historical Society, Tazewell, VA
 Bluefield College, Bluefield, VA
 Southwest Virginia Community College, Richlands, VA
 Historic Crab Orchard Museum & Pioneer Park, Tazewell, VA

 
Virginia counties
Counties of Appalachia
Bluefield micropolitan area
1799 establishments in Virginia
Populated places established in 1799
.